Charles "Chuck" Russell Arnold (May 30, 1926, Stamford, Connecticut – September 4, 1997, Santa Ana, California) was an American racecar driver. Arnold drove sporadically in the USAC Championship Car series, racing between 1959 and 1968, with 11 starts, including the 1959 Indianapolis 500. He finished in the top ten 3 times, with his best finish in 5th position, in 1959 at Trenton.

Indianapolis 500 results

Complete Formula One World Championship results
(key)

References

1926 births
1997 deaths
Indianapolis 500 drivers
Sportspeople from Stamford, Connecticut
Racing drivers from Connecticut